The 1985 Thailand Masters was a professional non-ranking snooker tournament held in September 1985 in Bangkok, Thailand.

Eight players entered into two groups four phase with each group winner progressing to the final. Dennis Taylor won the tournament, defeating Terry Griffiths 4–0 in the final.

Main draw

Group stage
Group A

 Dennis Taylor 2–0 Willie Thorne
 Dennis Taylor 2–0 James Wattana
 Willie Thorne 1–1 Tony Meo
 Willie Thorne 1–1 James Wattana

Group B

 Terry Griffiths 2–0 Steve Davis
 Terry Griffiths 2–0 Tony Knowles
 Terry Griffiths 2–0 Sakchai Sim Ngam
 Tony Knowles 2–0 Steve Davis
 Tony Knowles 2–0 Sakchai Sim Ngam
 Steve Davis 2–0 Sakchai Sim Ngam

Final
 Dennis Taylor 4–0 Terry Griffiths

References

1985 in snooker
1985 in Thai sport
Sport in Thailand
September 1985 sports events in Thailand